The following lists events that happened during 1825 in Australia.

Incumbents
Monarch - George IV

Governors
Governors of the Australian colonies:
Governor of New South Wales – Major-General Sir Thomas Brisbane
Lieutenant-Governor of Tasmania – Colonel George Arthur

Events
 14 June – Van Diemen's Land is separated administratively from New South Wales.
 3 December – Van Diemen's Land becomes fully independent from New South Wales. The Legislative Council of Tasmania is established and George Arthur, former Lieutenant-Governor, is promoted as its first Governor.

Exploration and settlement
 4 March – A penal settlement is established on Maria Island, Tasmania.
 Brisbane is founded.

Deaths
 25 February – Aboriginal bushranger, Musquito is hanged at Hobart.
 7 December – John Ovens, explorer (b. 1788)

References

 
Australia
Years of the 19th century in Australia